ICON is an annual science fiction convention held in the Cedar Rapids/ Iowa City area of Iowa since 1975, usually in late October or early November, under the auspices of the Mindbridge Foundation, a not-for-profit foundation also responsible for AnimeIowa and Gamicon. The organization was a branching off of the Science Fiction League of Iowa Students, which was founded by author Joe Haldeman. It is the oldest and largest science fiction convention in Iowa.

History 

1 - 1975 October 31-November 2 -SkinnyCon - Iowa City, Iowa
 Roger Zelazny  - author guest of honor
 Duck's Breath Mystery Theatre - guest of honor

2 - 1976 November 5–7 -Destructocon - Coralville, Iowa
 Frank Herbert  - author guest of honor
 Mike Glicksohn - guest of honor

3 - 1977 October 28–30 -  - Coralville, Iowa
 Joe Haldeman - author guest of honor and ICON founder
 Gay Haldeman - guest of honor

4 - 1979 November 9–11 -DisasterCon - Coralville, Iowa
 Gene Wolfe  - author guest of honor
 Rusty Hevelin  - guest of honor
 Moebius Theatre  - guest of honor

5 - 1980 November 7–9 -  - Cedar Rapids, Iowa
 Gordon R. Dickson - author guest of honor
 Bob and Anne Passavoy  - guest of honor

6 - 1981 October 30-November 1 -first appearance of Trans Iowa Canal Company - Coralville, Iowa
 Phyllis Eisenstein  - author guest of honor
 Dave Martin - guest of honor

7 - 1982 November 5–7 -  - Coralville, Iowa
 Poul Anderson  - author guest of honor
 Gregory Frost  - author guest of honor
 Rusty Hevelin  - guest of honor
 Mark Moore  - guest of honor

8 - 1983 October 21–23 -L-Con - Coralville, Iowa
 C. J. Cherryh - author guest of honor
 Rob Chilson - author guest of honor

9 - 1984 October 26–28 -  - Coralville, Iowa
 Dean Ing  - author guest of honor
 Robin Bailey - author guest of honor
 Bob Tucker - guest of honor

10 - 1985 October 25–27 -SFLIS Family Reunion - Coralville, Iowa
 George R. R. Martin  - author guest of honor
 Joe Haldeman - author guest of honor

11 - 1986 October 24–26 -Habittrail Con - Cedar Rapids, Iowa
 Robert Asprin  - author guest of honor
 Phil Foglio - artist guest of honor

12 - 1987 October 16–18 -Money-Grubbing Capitalist Con - Coralville, Iowa
 Glen Cook  - author guest of honor
 Dick Spelman - guest of honor

13 - 1989 January 20–22 -Beauty and the Beast Con-within-a-Con - Coralville, Iowa
 Joel Rosenberg - author guest of honor
 Algis Budrys  - author guest of honor
 Mickey Zucker Reichert  - author guest of honor
 Darlene Coltrain - guest of honor
 Roy Dotrice - media guest of honor

14 - 1989 October 13–15 -  - Coralville, Iowa
 Frederik Pohl  - author guest of honor
 P. D. Breeding-Black  - artist guest of honor
 Lucy Synk - artist guest of honor
 Elizabeth Anne Hull - guest of honor

15 - 1990 September 28–30 -  - Coralville, Iowa
 Philip José Farmer  - author guest of honor
 Erin McKee - artist guest of honor

16 - 1991 October 12–14  -GinCon aka BlondeCon - Coralville, Iowa
 Steven Brust  - author guest of honor
 Bob and Nonie Quinlan - fan guests of honor

17 - 1992 October 7–9 -Escape the Mundane CruiseCon, StressCon - Coralville, Iowa
 Mercedes Lackey - author guest of honor
 Larry Dixon - artist guest of honor
 Rex Bryant - fan guest of honor

18 - 1993 October 8–10 -Pirats of Phenzance, BarneyCon - Coralville, Iowa
 Suzette Haden Elgin  - author guest of honor
 Jody Lee - artist guest of honor
 Nancy and Martin McClure - fan guest of honor

19 - 1994 October 14–16 -One Last Teen Fling - Coralville, Iowa
 Gregory Frost  - author guest of honor
 Robert Daniels Jr. - artist guest of honor
 Joe Haldeman - guest of honor

20 - 1995 October 6–8 -ICON Goes Platinum - Coralville, Iowa
 Steven Barnes  - author guest of honor
 Phil Hester  - author/artist guest of honor
 Myrna Logan - fan guest of honor

21 - 1996 October 11–13 -ICON Comes of Age - Coralville, Iowa
 Emma Bull - author guest of honor
 Will Shetterly - author guest of honor
 Tadao Tomomatsu - fan guest of honor

22 - 1997 October 10–12 -Catch 22 - Coralville, Iowa
 John M. Ford  - author guest of honor
 Kaja Foglio - artist guest of honor
 William "Bear" Reed - fan guest of honor

23 - 1998 October 16–18 -"Working Today For A Better Tomorrow, Fnord" - Coralville, Iowa
 Charles de Lint - author guest of honor
 Forrest Ackerman - author guest of honor
 Ed Heil - artist guest of honor

24 - 1999 October 29–31 -efiL fO gninaeM ehT, The Return of HabitrailCon, Seat of Our Pants Con - Cedar Rapids, Iowa
 Peter Beagle - author guest of honor
 Bill Johnson - guest of honor
 Charles Piehl - guest of honor
 Tyler Walpole - artist guest of honor

25 - 2000 October 13–15 -Prodigal Son - Coralville, Iowa
 Harry Turtledove  - author guest of honor
 "Orange Mike" Lowrey - fan guest of honor

26 - 2001 October 12–14 -Hey, nice hotel! - Cedar Rapids, Iowa
 L. E. Modesitt, Jr.  - author guest of honor
 Denise Garner - artist guest of honor
 Dennis Lynch - fan guest of honor

27 - 2002 October 18–20 -Carrot Juice - Cedar Rapids, Iowa
 Jennifer Roberson  - author guest of honor
 John Garner - artist guest of honor
 Les & Jeannette Roth - fan guests of honor

28 - 2003 October 10–12 -Cheesy Poofs - Cedar Rapids, Iowa
 David Drake  - author guest of honor
 Lee Seed - artist guest of honor
 Gregg Parmentier - fan guest of honor

29 - 2004 October 8–10 -  - Cedar Rapids, Iowa
 Joe Haldeman  - author guest of honor
 Beth Hansen - artist guest of honor
 Gay Haldeman - guest of honor
 Rusty Hevelin - toastmaster

30 - 2005 October 28–30 -  - Cedar Rapids, Iowa
 Sarah Zettel  - author guest of honor
 Jael - artist guest of honor
 Arlene Martel - media guest of honor

31 - 2006 October 13–15 -Gallium: The Other Soft Metal - Cedar Rapids, Iowa
 C. S. Friedman  - author guest of honor
 Larry Price - artist guest of honor

32 - 2007 November 2–4 -Rise of the Phoenix - Coralville, Iowa
 Jack McDevitt  - author guest of honor
 Ralph J. Ryan - artist guest of honor
 Rusty Hevelin - toastmaster

33 - 2008 October 31-November 2 -Horror/Halloween - Coralville, Iowa
 Tanya Huff  - author guest of honor
 Alan M. Clark - artist guest of honor
 Richard Klemensen - guest of honor
 Rusty Hevelin - toastmaster

34 - 2009 October 23–25 -Adventures in the Secret Kingdom of Fandom - Cedar Rapids, Iowa
 Jim C. Hines  - author guest of honor
 Heather Bruton - artist guest of honor
 Rusty Hevelin - toastmaster

35 - 2010 November 5–7 -A Steam-Powered Convention of the Future - Cedar Rapids, Iowa
 Cory Doctorow  - author guest of honor
 Daniel Dociu - artist guest of honor
 Susan Leabhart - guest of honor
 Rusty Hevelin - toastmaster

36 - 2011 October 28–30 -Genre Fusion: When Worlds Collide - Cedar Rapids, Iowa
 Jane Yolen  - author guest of honor
 Steve Thomas - artist guest of honor
 Rusty Hevelin (in absentia), Denny Lynch - toastmaster

37 - 2012 November 2–4 -The Convention at the End of the Universe - Cedar Rapids, Iowa
 Steven Erikson - author guest of honor
 Mike Cole - artist guest of honor
 Jim C. Hines - co-toastmaster and author
 Dennis Lynch - co-toastmaster

38 - 2013 November 15–17 -Recalling 1013 - The Year When Nothing Happened - Cedar Rapids, Iowa
 Nancy Kress - author guest of honor
 Ellen Datlow - editor guest of honor
 Jack Skillingstead - writer guest of honor
 Joe Haldeman - author/artist guest of honor and ICON founder
 Gay Haldeman - editor and Mommy of ICON guest of honor
 Gregory Frost - author and Co-Founder of ICON
 Jim C. Hines - Toastmaster and author
 Steven Keith Tait - fan guest of honor

39 - 2014 October 31 - November 2 -League of Extraordinary Gentlefen - Cedar Rapids, Iowa
 Elizabeth Bear - author guest of honor
 Scott Lynch - editor guest of honor
 Lar deSouza - artist guest of honor
 Megan Lara - artist guest of honor
 Jim C. Hines - Toastmaster and author

40 - 2015 October 16–18 -Con of Futures Past - Cedar Rapids, Iowa
 David Gerrold - author guest of honor
 Sarah Clemens - artist guest of honor 
 Ann Leckie - author guest of honor
 Kalli McCandless - fan guest of honor
 Jim C. Hines - Toastmaster and author
 Joe Haldeman - author and ICON founder
 Gay Haldeman - editor and Mommy of ICON

41 - 2016 October 28–30 -Back to the ICON - Cedar Rapids, Iowa
 Seanan McGuire - author guest of honor
 Arden Ellen Nixon  - artist guest of honor
 Laura J. Mixon - special guest of honor
 Steven Gould - special guest of honor
 Inger Myers - fan guest of honor
 Jim C. Hines - Toastmaster and author

42 - 2017 September 29 - October 1, 2017 - Hitchhikers Guide to ICON42 - Cedar Rapids, Iowa
 Wesley Chu - author guest of honor
 H. Russ Brown - artist guest of honor
 Sheril Harper - fan guest of honor
 Jim C. Hines - Toastmaster and author
 Joe Haldeman - author and ICON founder
 Gay Haldeman - editor and Mommy of ICON

43 - 2018 October 5–7, 2018 - Eruption! - Cedar Rapids, Iowa
 Mike Mullin - author guest of honor
 Daniel Mohr - artist guest of honor
 Mike Miller - fan guest of honor
 Wolfie B. Bad - actor guest of honor
 Jim C. Hines - Toastmaster and author
 Joe Haldeman - author and ICON founder
 Gay Haldeman - editor and Mommy of ICON

44 - 2019 November 1–3, 2019 - Unpacking Non-Binary Reality - Cedar Rapids, Iowa
 Pat Murphy - author guest of honor
 Shawn Palek - Artist guest of honor
 Misty Palek - Artist guest of honor
 Kat Pepmiller - costumer/cosplay artist guest of honor
 Mystie Hollaman - fan guest of honor
 Jim C. Hines - Toastmaster and author

45 - 2020 October 9–10, 2020 - V-ICON: The Year ICON Went Virtual - Online only
 Joe Haldeman - author and founder of ICON
 Gay Haldeman - editor and founder of ICON
 Catrina Taylor - author
 Alex Penland - author
 Erin Casey - author
 Tambo Jones - author
 Beth Hudson - author

46 - 2021 October 15–17, 2021 - Seeking Further Horizons - Cedar Rapids, Iowa
 Eric Flint - Author Guest of Honor
 Jeff Lee Johnson - Artist Guest of Honor 
 Jim C. Hines - Toastmaster and author
 Joe Haldeman - author and founder of ICON
 Gay Haldeman - editor and founder of ICON
 Beth Hudson - fan guest of honor
 Cheshire Moon - Music guest of honor

47 - 2022 October 14–16, 2022 - The Prime Universe - Celebrating How Alternate Universes Intersect With Ours - Cedar Rapids, Iowa
 Nicholas Meyer, author
 Mitch Bentley, artist
 Steve & Jenny Todd, fans
 Jim C. Hines - Toastmaster and author

48 - 2023 October 13-15 - We only work in outer space! - Cedar Rapids, Iowa
 Lynne M. Thomas
 Michael Damian Thomas

References

External links 
Iowa ICON home page

Science fiction conventions in the United States
Festivals in Iowa
Recurring events established in 1975
Annual events in Iowa